Suleyman Sani Rzagulu bey oghlu Akhundov (3 October 1875 – 29 March 1939), was an Azerbaijani playwright, journalist, author, and teacher. He chose the name Sani (Arabic for "the second") to avoid confusion with his namesake, Mirza Fatali Akhundov.

Life and contributions
Akhundov was born to a noble family in Shusha (then part of the Russian Empire) and graduated from the Transcaucasian Teachers Seminary (present-day Gori, Georgia) in  1894. He was involved in teaching and journalism for the rest of his life. He was the co-author of the Azeri language textbook İkinci il ("The Second Year"), which was published in 1906. After Sovietization he served as Minister of Education of Azerbaijani SSR's Nagorno-Karabakh Autonomous Oblast for a short period of time. In 1922, Suleyman Sani Akhundov was chosen the first chairman of the Union of Writers and Poets of Azerbaijan. In 1932, he was awarded an honorary title of the Hero of Labour for his merits in literary and pedagogical activity. Between 1920 and 1930, he was chosen as a member of the Baku Soviet, probationary member of the Executive Committee of Baku, and mesehver of the Central Executive Committee of the Azerbaijan SSR.

Creativity stories  
Akhundov's first fictional piece, Tamahkar ("The Greedy One"), was written in 1899. Between 1912 and 1913 he wrote a pentalogy entitled Qorxulu nağıllar ("Scary Stories"), which dealt with the theme of poverty and social inequality and therefore became one of the most popular children books later in the Soviet epoch. Works written by the writer after the 1905 Russian Revolution were concerned with social-political problems, highlighting them from the democratic position. In his works written after 1920 he continued with his criticism of patriarchal norms, social backwardness, and despotism of the ruling class, and describes the expectations of people from the newly established political system. Such works as "Fortune's wheel" (1921), "Falcon's nest" (1921), "Love and revenge" (1922) drama were written by Suleyman Sani Akhundov.

Legacy
There's a street named after Suleyman Sani Akhundov in Baku.

References

External links
 Scary Stories by Suleyman Sani Akhundov

Azerbaijani dramatists and playwrights
Azerbaijani educators
1875 births
1939 deaths
Writers from Shusha
19th-century Azerbaijani dramatists and playwrights
20th-century Azerbaijani dramatists and playwrights
20th-century Azerbaijani educators
Writers from the Russian Empire
Educators from the Russian Empire
Transcaucasian Teachers Seminary alumni